The Middleback Range is a mountain range on the eastern side of Eyre Peninsula in South Australia. The Middleback Range has been a source of iron ore for over a century, particularly to feed the Whyalla Steelworks. Mines in the region were first developed by BHP from the 1890s and are now owned and operated by Liberty House Group.

Geography
The Middleback Range extends from Iron Knob at the northern end near the Eyre Highway to the Lincoln Highway, halfway between Whyalla and Cowell at its southern extent.

The Ironstone Hill Conservation Park is immediately west of the southern part of the ranges.

Geology
The Middleback Range is part of the Cleve Subdomain of the Gawler Craton. The iron ore deposits are primarily of Early Proterozoic metasediments of the Hutchison Group.

Mining
All of the mines in the Middleback Range are operated as open pit mines, producing magnetite and hematite ores. Magnetite is processed at Whyalla, and hematite is exported. The mines are serviced by the BHP Whyalla Tramway, a  railway which convey the ore to Whyalla's port and steelworks. , the operating mines of the Middleback Range are: Iron Duchess, Iron Knight, Iron Duke, Iron Magnet, Iron Baron and Iron Chieftain.

Iron ore mines in the Middleback Range include:
 Iron Knob
 Iron Monarch
 Iron Prince
 Iron Princess
 Iron Baron
 Iron Queen
 Iron Cavalier
 Iron Chieftain
 Iron Duke
 Iron Duchess 
 Iron Magnet

See also
Iron ore in Australia
Mining in Australia
Timeline of South Australian history
Whyalla Steelworks

References

Mountain ranges of South Australia
Geology of South Australia
Eyre Peninsula
Far North (South Australia)
Mining in South Australia